Mary Susannah Edgar was a Canadian author of several books, one-act plays and hymns, the most famous of them being God Who Touchest Earth with Beauty, which has been translated into several languages and placed in hymnals around the world.

Biography
Mary Susannah Edgar was born in Sundridge, Ontario on May 23, 1889. She was the daughter of Joseph Edgar and Mary Little, from Sundridge, Ontario. Her schooling took her from Sundridge to Barrie High School and Havergal College, Toronto, Ontario.

In 1922, she opened a girls' camp near Sundridge on Lake Bernard, called Glen Bernard. Edgar continued as the camp's director until her retirement in 1956. Her life was devoted to working with girls and camping through many local, provincial and national organizations.

She was the author of many books, plays and hymns. One such hymn is "O God of All the Many Lands".

Edgar died on September 17, 1973.

Works

Books
 Wood-fire and Candlelight (1945)
 Under Open Skies (1956)
 The Christmas Wreath of Verse (1967)
 Once there was a Camper (1970)
 A Magic Store (poem)

References

1889 births
1973 deaths
Canadian Anglicans
Canadian women dramatists and playwrights
People from Parry Sound District
20th-century Canadian dramatists and playwrights
20th-century Canadian women writers